The , and later  were limited express train services operated by Hokkaido Railway Company (JR Hokkaido) on the Hakodate Main Line between the cities of Sapporo and Asahikawa in Hokkaido, Japan, between 1986 and 2007.

History

From 1 September 1990, the service was renamed Super White Arrow with the introduction of new 785 series EMUs.

Services were discontinued from the start of the 1 October 2007 timetable revision when the Super White Arrow was combined with the Lilac service to form the new Super Kamui service.

Service pattern
White Arrow services served the following stations:
  -  -  - 

Super White Arrow services operated at hourly intervals, with 13 return workings daily, departing on the hour from Sapporo and Asahikawa, and served the following stations:
  -  -  (some trains only) -  (some trains only) -  -  - 

The Super White Arrow services operated at a maximum speed of 130 km/h, with an average speed of 102.6 km/h, completing the 136.8 km journey in 1 hour and 20 minutes.

Rolling stock
 781 series 4-car EMUs (White Arrow) 1986–1990
 785 series 4/6-car (later 5-car) EMUs (Super White Arrow) 1990–2007

References

External links

Hokkaido Railway Company
Named passenger trains of Japan
Railway services introduced in 1986
Railway services introduced in 1990
Railway services discontinued in 2007